Admiral Sir George St Vincent King  (15 July 1809 – 18 August 1891) was a Royal Navy officer who went on to be Commander-in-Chief, China Station.

Early life
King was born on 15 July 1809 at Stonehouse, Devon, the second son of Vice-Admiral Sir Richard King and Sarah Anne née Duckworth. He was educated at Royal Naval College, Portsmouth.

Naval career
King joined the Royal Navy in 1822. Promoted to Captain in 1841, he commanded HMS Leander in the Black Sea during the Crimean War. He commanded HMS Rodney from 1854 and HMS St Jean d'Acre from 1855. In September 1856, HMS St Jean d'Acre took Earl Granville to the coronation of Czar Alexander II at St Petersburg. Earl Granville was leader of the Liberal party in the House of Lords, and head of the British delegation to Alexander II's coronation.

He was appointed Commander-in-chief, East Indies and China Station in 1864 and Commander-in-Chief, China Station in 1865. He retired in 1877 and succeeded his elder brother as the 4th Baronet in 1887.

Family life
King married Lady Caroline Mary Dawson Damer in 1847. He assumed the arms and prefix surname of the Duckworth family from Admiral Sir John Duckworth, his grandfather, in 1888. King died at his home Wear House in Exeter, Devon, on 18 August 1891 aged 82. He was buried in a new vault at Topsham Cemetery, Exeter on 25 August 1891.

References

External links
 

|-

1809 births
1891 deaths
Royal Navy admirals
Knights Commander of the Order of the Bath
Royal Navy personnel of the Crimean War
Baronets in the Baronetage of Great Britain